Patrick McCaughey (born 1942) is an Irish-born Australian art historian and academic.

McCaughey was born in Belfast, his father being Davis McCaughey. He migrated with his family to Melbourne, Australia. when he was ten years old. His secondary education was at Scotch College, Melbourne.  He resided at Ormond College, University of Melbourne, where he studied Fine Arts and English Literature. He became art critic for The Age newspaper in Melbourne in 1966. He was well known for his advocacy of abstract expressionism and of Australian artists, in particular Fred Williams.

On return to Australia from a year-long Harkness Fellowship in New York, he was appointed as the first professor of fine arts at Monash University in 1972 and the Monash Department of Visual Arts had its first intake in 1975. From 1981 he was the director of the National Gallery of Victoria.

In 1988 he left Australia for the United States, where he held positions including director of the Wadsworth Atheneum (1988–96), the chair in Australian Studies at Harvard University, and the director of the Yale Center for British Art.

McCaughey was married to Winsome McCaughey. He retired to Connecticut with his partner, Donna Curran. He continues to write, while she runs a restaurant.

Bibliography

 The Pyramid in the Waste: The Search for Meaning in Australian Art 1983
 Fred Williams 1927-1982 1987, 1996, 2008
 The Bright Shapes and the True Names: A Memoir 2003
 Voyage and Landfall: The Art of Jan Senbergs 2006 
 Strange Country: Why Australian Painting Matters 2014

Articles

References

1942 births
Australian art historians
University of Melbourne alumni
Living people
Australian people of Irish descent